Bijan Robinson (born January 30, 2002) is an American football running back for the Texas Longhorns. He won the Doak Walker Award and was a unanimous All-American in 2022.

Early years
Robinson was born on January 30, 2002, in Tucson, Arizona, later attending Salpointe Catholic High School. During his football career there, he set a state record after rushing for 7,036 yards and 114 touchdowns. As a senior, he was the Arizona Gatorade Football Player of the Year after rushing for 2,235 yards and 38 touchdowns on 126 carries. He was selected to play in the 2020 All-American Bowl. A five-star recruit, Robinson committed to play college football at the University of Texas.

College career
Robinson earned immediate playing time as a freshman at Texas in 2020. He earned the 2020 Alamo Bowl MVP with 10 rushes for 183 yards and a touchdown.

References

External links
Texas Longhorns bio

2002 births
Living people
21st-century African-American sportspeople
African-American players of American football
All-American college football players
American football running backs
Players of American football from Tucson, Arizona
Sportspeople from Tucson, Arizona
Texas Longhorns football players